The following is a list of artists, past and present, who have had recordings released on the Don Giovanni Records label:

Artists
700 Bliss
Agua Viva
Alice
Atom And His Package
Aye Nako
Alice Bag
Bad Bad Hats
Bad Moves
Bat Fangs
Lee Bains & The Glory Fires
Big Eyes
Black Wine
Blizzard Babies
Mal Blum
Brick Mower
Byrds Of Paradise
California X
Cherokee Rose
The Degenerics
Downtown Boys
Dusk
Dustheads
Mikey Erg
The Ergs!
Ex-Vöid
Exmaid
Fake Limbs
Fat Tony
For Science
Erica Freas
Full Of Fancy
Chris Gethard
Giant Peach
Evan Greer
The Groucho Marxists
Hellhole
Hilly Eye
Hprizm
Hunchback
Irreversible Entanglements
Izzy True
Jeffrey Lewis
Kamikaze
Kissing Is A Crime
Amy Klein
Laura Stevenson
Larry Livermore
Lavender Country
L7
Light Beams
Luggage
The Lookouts
Jenny Mae
Marvin Berry & the New Sound
The Measure (SA)
Mitski
Modern Hut
Moor Mother
Moor Jewelry
Mourning [A] BLKstar
Nana Grizol
Noun
Nude Beach
Nuclear Santa Claust
Omololu
Outer Spaces
Painted Zeros
Paisley Fields
Pinkwash
Plastic Cross
Priests
Pregnant
Project 27
P.S. Eliot
Roadside Graves
Rubber Molding
RVIVR
The Sad Tomorrows
Sammus
Keith Secola
Sex Stains
Screaming Females
Shape Shifter
She/Her/hers
Snakebite
Speed Stick
Shellshag
Peter Stampfel
The Steinways
Stormshadow
Supercrush
Swamp Dogg
Talk Hard
Tenement
Teenage Halloween
Upset
Vacation
Waxahatchee
Weakened Friends
Worriers
Zenizen

See also 
 Don Giovanni Records

Don Giovanni Records